Przhevalsky is a 1951 Soviet drama film directed by Sergei Yutkevich.

Plot 
The film tells about the outstanding Russian traveler Nikolai Przhevalsky, who headed the expedition to the Ussuri region and four scientific expeditions to Central Asia. He described its nature, discovered a huge number of ridges, lakes, and rivers, and organized a collection of various collections of plants and animals.

Starring 
 Vsevolod Larionov		
 Sergey Martinson	
 Sergey Papov	
 Vladimir Taskin as Benjamin Disraeli
 Boris Tenin

References

External links 
 

1951 films
1950s Russian-language films
Films scored by Georgy Sviridov
Soviet drama films
1951 drama films